Daas is a 2005 Indian Tamil-language romantic action film written and directed by newcomer Babu Yogeswaran. The film stars Jayam Ravi and Renuka Menon in lead and Vadivelu, Adithya Menon, Shanmugarajan, Monica, Abhinay, and Salim Ghouse, among others, in supporting roles. The film's score and soundtrack are composed by Yuvan Shankar Raja. The film released on 29 July 2005.

Plot
The film begins in a small village in Tirunelveli district where a few upper-caste men hold a chariot festival. Antony Daas (Jayam Ravi), along with his friends, pulls the chariot into their slum. The friends naturally incur the wrath of a local leader named Annachi (Shanmugarajan). Meanwhile, his daughter Rajeshwari (Renuka Menon) falls in love with Daas. Her sister Punitha (Monica) elopes to marry a lower-caste boy named Guna (Abhinay), who is a classmate of Daas. Coming to know about this, Annachi sends his men to bump off Punitha and Guna. He eventually sets them ablaze in front of Daas. An angry Rajeshwari, in order to teach her father a lesson, elopes with Daas and vows to get married. The couple then seeks refuge in Nasser's (Krishna) house in Madurai. He promises to get them married. However, coming to know about their hideout, Annachi's men reach Madurai to foil their plans. Nasser's father Vappa (Salim Ghouse) promises to get them united. Enters Nasser's brother Anwar (Adithya Menon), who plans to let loose terror in the Madurai town in the name of Jehad. How Daas emerges triumphant from all the troubles and marries Rajeshwari forms the rest of the story.

Cast

Production
The film was initially titled as Rascal before it got changed as Daas named after the character of protagonist. Daas was Jayam Ravi's third film and his first original film following two remakes, the film featured him as a football player.

Soundtrack

The musical score as well as the soundtrack were composed by noted music composer Yuvan Shankar Raja. The soundtrack, released on 21 April 2005, features 6 songs, the lyrics for which are written by Pa. Vijay, Viveka and Yugabharathi. The song "Vaa Vaa" was reused from Ilaiyaraaja's old song "Adiye Manam Nilluna Nikkathadi" from the 1984 film Neengal Kettavai. The song "Saami kitta" was a critical acclaim for the singers and the music director. Shreya Ghoshal received a nomination from Tamil Isai Viruthugal.

Release
The film took an even bigger opening than his previous ones and was declared a hit as well. He garnered positive remarks from critics, with Sify's reviewer claiming that Ravi was a "hundred percent convincing as an action hero," further labelling his performance as "impressive." Lajjavathi of Kalki called it "one time watchable".

References

External links
 

2005 films
2000s Tamil-language films
Films scored by Yuvan Shankar Raja
2005 directorial debut films
2005 action films